Rx Murder is a 1958 American crime film directed by Derek Twist and written by John W. Gossage and Derek Twist. It is based on the 1955 novel The Deeds of Dr. Deadcert by Joan Fleming. The film stars Rick Jason, Lisa Gastoni, Marius Goring, Sandu Scott, Mary Merrall and Vida Hope. It was released on February 18, 1958 by 20th Century Fox.

Plot

Cast    
Rick Jason as Jethro Jones
Lisa Gastoni as Kitty Mortlock
Marius Goring as Doctor Henry Dysert
Sandu Scott as Stella Dysert
Mary Merrall as Miss Bettyhill
Vida Hope as Louise
Helen Shingler as Charlotte
Phyllis Neilson-Terry as Lady Lacy
Nicholas Hannen as Colonel
Kynaston Reeves as Mr. Sparrow
Avice Landone as Mrs. Motlock
Frederick Leister as Dr. Alexander
Patrick Waddington as Sir George Watson
Totti Truman Taylor as Mrs. Davies
Noel Hood as Lady Watson

References

External links
 

1958 films
American crime films
British crime films
1958 crime films
20th Century Fox films
CinemaScope films
Films directed by Derek Twist
1950s English-language films
1950s American films
1950s British films